Marián Bochnovič (born 3 March 1970) is a retired Slovak football midfielder.

A youth international for Czechoslovakia, Bochnovič was a squad member at the 1989 FIFA World Youth Championship. He was later capped four times for Slovakia.

References

1970 births
Living people
Slovak footballers
FC Nitra players
Bohemians 1905 players
FK Dukla Banská Bystrica players
FC VSS Košice players
FK Dubnica players
1. FC Tatran Prešov players
First Vienna FC players
Hapoel Tzafririm Holon F.C. players
Czech First League players
Slovak expatriate footballers
Expatriate footballers in the Czech Republic
Slovak expatriate sportspeople in the Czech Republic
Expatriate footballers in Austria
Slovak expatriate sportspeople in Austria
Expatriate footballers in Israel
Slovak expatriate sportspeople in Israel
Association football midfielders
Czechoslovakia youth international footballers
Czechoslovakia under-21 international footballers
Slovakia international footballers